Cyril Judd was a joint pseudonym used by American writers Cyril M. Kornbluth and Judith Merril for their two novels: 
 Gunner Cade (1952);  serialized in Astounding Science Fiction in 1952.
 Outpost Mars (1952, reprinted as Sin in Space in 1961; serialised as Mars Child in Galaxy Science Fiction in 1951.)

References

American science fiction writers
Science fiction shared pseudonyms